Kamarbon is a village in Owzrud Rural District, Baladeh District, Noor County, Mazandaran Province, Iran. At the 2006 census, its population was 89, in 29 families.

References 

Populated places in Nur County